The President of the Hamburg Parliament presides over the sessions of the Bürgerschaft, the parliament of Hamburg, with functions similar to that of a speaker in other countries. In the Hamburg order of precedence, the office is ranked first before the first Mayor.

History 
The office of the President of the Hamburg Parliament exists since December 6, 1859. It was constitutionally established on September 28, 1860. Johannes Versmann was the first President of the Hamburg Parliament. Herbert Dau held the office of president the longest period from 1960 to 1978. The current President of the Bürgerschaft since 2011 is Carola Veit.

Election and Customs 
The President of the Hamburg Parliament is elected during the constituent session of each election period after the election by all members of the Bürgerschaft. The president has to be a member. Until the election of the president, the session is chaired by the Father of the House, the so-called "Alterspräsident", the oldest member of the Bürgerschaft.

Usually, the President of the Bürgerschaft is a member of the largest parliamentary group.

Hamburg Parliament